NASD may refer to:

National Agricultural Safety Database, maintained by the Centers for Disease Control and Prevention
National Amalgamated Stevedores and Dockers, a British trade union
National Association of Securities Dealers, the former name of the American self-regulatory organization for broker-dealers, now known as the Financial Industry Regulatory Authority (FINRA)
Network-Attached Secure Disks, a 1997–2001 research project of Carnegie Mellon University, with the goal of providing cost-effective scalable storage bandwidth
Network Audio System Daemon, software for transparent remote access to local audio hardware
Norristown Area School District, located in Montgomery County, Pennsylvania
North Allegheny School District, located in Wexford, Pennsylvania